The brown-backed solitaire (Myadestes occidentalis) is considered a thrush and is placed in the family Turdidae. It is a medium-sized bird about 21 centimeters (8 inches) long. It is a mostly grayish bird with brown flight feathers (hence the "brown back" when it is perched), a white eye ring and white rectrices (tail) feathers.

Habitat and range
It is relatively common in the mountains of Mexico and northern Central America. It tends to be found in semi-deciduous mountain forests, including mixed pine-oak forests. It is often found near streams.

In the American Birding Association Area, it is Code 5. One singing bird was found in Miller Canyon, in the Huachuca Mountains of Southeastern Arizona, and documented by the youth birding Victor Emanuel Nature Tours' Camp Chiricahua in July 2009. This bird was the first accepted record of this species in the ABA area, notable since several other previous records had been rejected due to question of origin.

The bird was located, identified, and documented by Benjamin Van Doren, Philippa Tanford, James Warren, Fer Farias, Ted Stiritz, Erich Lehner, Benjamin Vizzachero, Ethan Gyllenhaal, Megan O'Brien, Brian Magnier, Vincent Pellegrino, and leaders Robert Day, Dave Jasper, and Rebekah McIntyre. A heard-only bird in Morse Canyon, Chiricahuas, Arizona, was documented by John Yerger in May 2011, and is pending acceptance. A wildfire shut down the trail, and the bird was not refound.

Voice
The brown-backed solitaire's song is a crescendo of accelerating, descending notes, often described as flute- or bell-like. This species also has a squealing, metallic call and a raspy alarm call.

Taxonomy
Placed in the genus Myadestes, the brown-backed solitaire is closely related to other thrushes sharing the common name of "solitaire."

References

Howell, Steve N.G., and Sophie Webb. "A Guide to the Birds of Mexico and Northern Central America." Oxford University Press, New York, 1995.

Further reading

 

brown-backed solitaire
Birds of Mexico
Birds of Guatemala
Birds of Honduras
brown-backed solitaire
Birds of the Sierra Madre Occidental
Birds of the Sierra Madre Oriental
Birds of the Sierra Madre del Sur
Birds of the Trans-Mexican Volcanic Belt